The third season of the American television series The Mandalorian stars Pedro Pascal as the title character, a bounty hunter traveling to Mandalore to redeem his past transgressions with his adopted son Grogu. It is part of the Star Wars franchise, set after the events of Return of the Jedi (1983). The season is produced by Lucasfilm, Fairview Entertainment, and Golem Creations, with Jon Favreau serving as showrunner.

Development on a third season of The Mandalorian began by late April 2020, and it was officially confirmed that December. Filming began by October 2021 and wrapped in late March 2022.

The eight-episode season premiered on the streaming service Disney+ on March 1, 2023, and will run until April 19, 2023. A fourth season is in development.

Episodes

Cast and characters

Starring 
 Pedro Pascal as Din Djarin / The Mandalorian
 Brendan Wayne and Lateef Crowder as the on-set doubles for the Mandalorian
 Katee Sackhoff as Bo-Katan Kryze
 Grogu

Co-stars

 Emily Swallow as The Armorer
 Carl Weathers as Greef Karga

 Amy Sedaris as Peli Motto
 Omid Abtahi as Penn Pershing
 Katy O'Brian as Elia Kane
 Giancarlo Esposito as Moff Gideon
 Christopher Lloyd
 Tim Meadows

Production

Development 
By late April 2020, The Mandalorian creator and showrunner Jon Favreau had been writing a third season for "a while" and further development on the season was beginning. That September, co-star Giancarlo Esposito said the second season would "start to lay the groundwork for the depth and breadth that's going to come in season 3 and season 4, where you're really gonna start to get answers." After the second-season finale announced The Book of Boba Fett for December 2021, commentators speculated that the third season would be shifting focus from Din Djarin, The Mandalorian, to Boba Fett. Favreau soon clarified that The Book of Boba Fett was a separate spin-off series that was already in production in December 2020, with the third season of The Mandalorian again focusing on Djarin. He added that the third season was in pre-production, and filming would begin in 2021. Bryce Dallas Howard, Rick Famuyiwa, and co-star Carl Weathers all directed episodes after doing so for previous seasons, with Famuyiwa also being promoted to executive producer. Lee Isaac Chung, Peter Ramsey, and Rachel Morrison all directed episodes of the season.

Writing 
Favreau wrote all eight episodes of the season, working with Noah Kloor on the third and Dave Filoni on the fourth and seventh episodes. The season picks up after the events of The Book of Boba Fett (2021), with the Mandalorian and Grogu traveling to Mandalore so Din Djarin can redeem himself for his transgressions of removing his helmet. Discussing the absence of Cara Dune in the season following the firing of actress Gina Carano, Famuyiwa said the character was still "a big part... of the world" and that Favreau took the time to address her absence. However, the creatives knew "the heart of the show" was Din Djarin and Grogu with Filoni stating the season was "mainly dealing with Mandalorians and the Mandalorian saga, the Mandalorian tale", and how that affects the duo's story.

Casting 
Pedro Pascal stars in the series as The Mandalorian. The Mandalorian is also portrayed by stunt doubles Brendan Wayne and Lateef Crowder, with Wayne and Crowder receiving co-star credit for the first time in the third season. In November 2020, Esposito said he expected to be featured more prominently in the third season than previous ones. Also returning are Carl Weathers as Greef Karga, Katee Sackhoff as Bo-Katan Kryze, Emily Swallow as The Armorer, Amy Sedaris as Peli Motto, and Omid Abtahi as Penn Pershing. Katy O'Brian co-stars as Elia Kane, reprising the role from the second season. Paul Sun-Hyung Lee also reprises his role as Carson Teva. In March 2022, Christopher Lloyd was revealed to be a guest star for the season, and in May 2022 it was revealed that Tim Meadows would appear in the season.

Filming 
Filming for the season began by October 13, 2021, with David Klein serving as the cinematographer. It had previously been expected to begin once filming for The Book of Boba Fett completed in June 2021, but was unable to then because Obi-Wan Kenobi was using the Los Angeles soundstages. Esposito noted that the production did not need to wait for Pascal to complete filming the HBO series The Last of Us since the Mandalorian is primarily seen with his helmet on. Regarding filming the season during the COVID-19 pandemic, Favreau felt The Mandalorian was in an advantageous situation since many characters are in masks and the series employs "a lot of digital work that augments things", allowing the production to be flexible to adhere to filming protocols. Filming wrapped on March 29, 2022. Reshoots occurred in early July 2022.

Music 
In February 2023, Joseph Shirley was revealed to be composing the score for the season, replacing Ludwig Göransson. Shirley previously provided additional music for the first two seasons and used Göransson's themes to compose the score for The Book of Boba Fett.

Marketing 
Filoni, Favreau, and Sackhoff promoted the season at Lucasfilm's Star Wars Celebration panel on May 26, 2022, revealing the first teaser to those in attendance. They returned for a panel on The Mandalorian and The Book of Boba Fett on May 28 along with Pascal, Esposito, and Weathers, where more footage from the season was shown. Filoni, Favreau, and cast members promoted the season at the 2022 D23 Expo, while also debuting a trailer. A second trailer for the season was released on January 16, 2023, during Monday Night Football. The trailer had 83.5 million global views in its first 24 hours, becoming the most viewed trailer in that time period for a Star Wars Disney+ series; surpassing Obi-Wan Kenobi (58 million views).

Release 
The season premiered on March 1, 2023 on Disney+, and will consist of eight episodes.

Reception

Audience viewership 
According to Whip Media's TV Time, The Mandalorian was the most streamed television series across all platforms in the United States, during the week of March 5, 2023, and during the week of March 12, 2023.

Critical response 

The review aggregator website Rotten Tomatoes reported an 85% approval rating with an average score of 7.4/10 based on 106 reviews. Metacritic, which uses a weighted average, assigned a score of 70 out of 100 based on 14 critics, indicating "generally favorable reviews".

Notes

References

External links 
 

2023 American television seasons
3